Payal Ghosh (born 1992) is an Indian actress and politician in Ramdas Athawale's  political party holding the post of vice president of its women's wing.

Early life
She studied at St. Paul's Mission School Kolkata and graduated in Political Science Honours from the Scottish Church College, Kolkata. Presently, she is residing and working in Mumbai.

Career

Acting
When she was 17 years old, she had accompanied her friend to an audition for Sharpe's Peril and landed a role in the BBC Telefilm. In the period drama based on English soldier Richard Sharpe, Payal had played a village girl, the daughter of a revolutionary freedom fighter from Bengal. Payal also starred in a Canadian film in which she played a school girl in love with her neighbour's servant. Since her parents disapproved of her decision to join films, during her college holidays, she ran away from her home in Calcutta and came to Mumbai. She joined Namit Kishore's acting academy, where she met Chandra Sekhar Yeleti who offered her the lead role in his Prayanam, opposite Manchu Manoj. Later, she was seen in the Telugu films Mr. Rascal and Oosaravelli and the Kannada film Varshadhare.

She completed her first Tamil film Therodum Veedhiyile, directed by Saro Sriram, in which played a traditional girl, who lives in Erode. She was selected as the female lead by Vivek Agnihotri for his Bollywood film Freedom and filmed for it in 2012. She signed another Hindi comedy film, Patel Ki Punjabi Shaadi opposite Vir Das, directed by Sanjay Chhel. which released worldwide on 15 September 2017.

In April 2020, she stated that she was out of work, financially broke, and was leading a life she had never imagined.

Defamation suit
On 23 September 2020, Ghosh accused Anurag Kashyap and filed a police complaint for sexually harassing her at Yari Road in Versova, Mumbai in 2013. Kashyap dismissed the allegations as baseless, calling it an attempt to silence him from criticising the government. On 1 October, Mumbai police called Kashyap for questioning about the case. He denied the allegations and provided documents as evidence to prove that he was filming in Sri Lanka at the time, when Ghosh alleged the incident in Mumbai had taken place.

In October actor Richa Chadha filed defamation suit in Bombay High Court against Payal Ghosh seeking ₹1.1 Crore damages for attempting to unnecessarily drag Chadha's name into Ghosh's allegation against Kashyap. After Payal Ghosh gave an un-conditional apology to Richa Chadha for her defamatory remarks, Bombay HC recorded the settlement of the case.

Politics
On 26 October 2020 she joined Ramdas Athawale's political party and on the same day, she was appointed the vice president of its women's wing.

Filmography

Television

References

External links

 

Living people
Actresses in Telugu cinema
Scottish Church College alumni
Actresses in Tamil cinema
Actresses in Hindi cinema
21st-century Indian actresses
Indian film actresses
1992 births
Actresses from Kolkata
Indian television actresses
Republican Party of India (Athawale) politicians